Colville School District No. 115 is a public school district in Stevens County, Washington and serves the town of Colville. The district offers classes from Pre-K to Grade 12.

Schools

High schools

Colville High School was constructed in 1993 and serves grades 9-12.

This high school was built to replace the old high school located on Elm Street. The old high school has been renovated into a community college.

Junior high schools
Colville Junior High School was constructed in 1972 and serves grades 6–8.

Elementary schools

Fort Colville Elementary was constructed in 1982 and serves Grades 3rd, 4th, and 5th.

Hofstetter Elementary was constructed in 1951s and serves grades Kindergarten, 1st and 2nd.

Aster Elementary was constructed in 1940 as a Works Progress Administration project and serves as an Alternative High School, Preschool, and a Homeschooling Program.

References

External links
Colville School District No. 115
Colville School District Report Card

School districts in Washington (state)
Education in Stevens County, Washington